Oakland Park is a former village in Jasper County, Missouri, United States. It was located on U.S. Route 71 (Rangeline Road- now Business I-49) in the Joplin area. Oakland Park's population in 1990 was 89. It incorporated in 1957; in 1996, it merged with nearby Webb City.

Former villages in Missouri
Former populated places in Jasper County, Missouri
Populated places disestablished in 1996
Former populated places in Missouri